David Lichtenstein is an American billionaire entrepreneur and real estate investor. He is the founder and CEO of The Lightstone Group, which he founded in 1988. During the early years of the Lightstone Group, Lichtenstein focused on investing in multifamily properties. He rapidly grew his portfolio in the 1990s, before diversifying his portfolio and moving into retail. In 2003, Lichtenstein acquired Prime Retail for $638 million, seen as one of the largest retail purchases in United States at the time.

Since 2007, Lichtenstein has been responsible for some of the largest acquisitions and sales in the retail and hospitality sectors. In 2007, The Lightstone Group acquired Extended Stay Hotels for $8.1 billion and sold Prime Retail in 2010 for $2.1 billion, earning a large profit from the sale of the outlet mall group. Lichtenstein has more recently been involved in New York City real estate and is playing a large role in the redevelopment of Brooklyn and the Gowanus Canal area of the borough.

Lichtenstein was appointed to the NYC Economic Development Corporation's board of directors in 2015 by Bill de Blasio and is on the board of governors of the Real Estate Board of New York.

Early life
Lichtenstein was born in 1960 into a Jewish family in New York City, United States. He grew up in the working class neighborhood of Sheepshead Bay, Brooklyn and graduated from James Madison High School (Brooklyn).  He developed an avid interest in property during his twenties and launched his real estate career after the purchase of a single building. At the time, Lichtenstein was living in a two-family home in New Jersey.

He purchased his first property with a $12,000 down payment in the mid-1980s, which he funded by maxing out credit cards and using some funds from a small savings account. Over a three-year period, Lichtenstein reinvested capital from his properties to fund the down-payments on more properties. He then leveraged the new properties with loans, allowing Lichtenstein to continue to add to his portfolio.

As a Haredi Jew, Lichtenstein spent a number of years studying in yeshiva and kollel. He is a talmid of the Mirrer Yeshiva in Brooklyn and Yerushalayim. He is a Talmid of Rav Nochum Partzovitz and Rav Shlomo Zalman Auerbach. Lichtenstein has donated significantly to many Jewish institutions both in and out of New York. He is seen as a community leader in the New York Jewish scene.

Career

Founding of Lightstone (1988–2003)
Following the success of running a small real estate business during the early to mid-1980s, Lichtenstein founded The Lightstone Group in 1988. The company was founded in Lakewood, New Jersey, and grew quickly during the early years of the company's history. During the first few years of Lightstone's activity, Lichtenstein focused on acquiring multifamily properties in the New Jersey area.

In the 1990s, Lichtenstein grew The Lightstone Group's portfolio to over 20,000 apartments in 28 states. The company was recognized as one of the top 30 apartment owners across the United States around the same time. From 1997 onwards, there was a housing price boom in the United States, which lasted for nearly a decade. The boom was good for the existing portfolio Lichtenstein had amassed, but it made it more difficult to find affordable properties to purchase.

The housing bubble that began in 1997 led Lichtenstein to look elsewhere at other real estate opportunities, which included property outside the United States for the first time. In 2000, Lightstone began to invest in retail strips, and subsequently into investing in malls. His first major purchase in retail came in 2002, when he acquired a Prime Retail-run mall for $36.5 million. The outlet mall was based in Puerto Rico and was one of many Prime Retail developments that required redevelopment at the time of purchase. Lichtenstein stated in an interview that outlet malls at the time had become an "out-of-favor stock in an out-of-favor industry".

After seeing the potential of the single mall in Puerto Rico, Lichtenstein made his first major deal in the real estate market in 2003. He purchased the entire Prime Retail portfolio for $638 million. The portfolio consisted of 37 properties spread across a number of states in the US, in locations such as Pleasant Prairie, Wis., Odessa, Mo, and Gaffney, S.C. The acquisition made Lightstone the second-largest owner of outlet malls in the country after Chelsea Premium Outlets, owned by Simon Property Group Inc., the nation's largest mall owner. The acquisition made Lichtenstein the owner of a number of famous buildings and properties in Chicago, where Prime Retail had previously been based. They included the IBM Plaza, 208 South LaSalle Street and the United Building. With the purchase of Prime, Lightstone also took control of some famous Chicago commercial spaces, including such world-renowned buildings as the Mies van der Rohe-designed IBM Plaza, 208 South LaSalle Street and the United Building.

By the end of 2003, Lightstone was recognized as one of the largest and most active property buyers in the United States. The portfolio had an estimated value of $1–2 billion at that time.

REIT and further investments (2004–2010)
Lichtenstein announced in 2006 that he would be launching a real estate investing trust (REIT), which allowed Lightstone to raise capital from outside investors. The REIT, named Lightstone Value Plus, had a fund value of $300 million and aimed to invest in a mix of office, retail and other commercial properties. According to The New York Times, many developers at the time were focusing on "trophy buildings" in major United States cities. His strategy differed from that of many major investors at the time, as he stated, "do you want to go to a fishing hole where there's a lot of other people fishing, or do you want to be where you're the only guy with a hook in the water? We would concentrate on any place where the big boys aren't."

During the same year, Lichtenstein returned to investing in housing with a number of large investments in affordable housing. He purchased 5,000 units across 19 multifamily rental properties in Detroit. It was reported that the entire deal was for a total of $200 million. His second housing deal of the year was in Birmingham, Alabama, where he spent a total of $303 million on a number of apartment buildings. While expanding the diversity of investments, he also moved into hospitality in 2007 with his biggest single deal to date. Lightstone acquired Extended Stay Hotels for a total of $8.1 billion, making Lightstone the parent company of one of the largest mid-priced hotel brands in the United States. At the time, it was said the hotel group had 683 hotels across 44 US states and Canada.

Lichtenstein sold Prime Retail in 2010 to Simon Property Group, who were already the biggest outlet mall owners in the United States. The $2.3 billion deal freed up cash for further investments.

Recent investments (2011–present)
Lichtenstein's Lightstone Value Plus was one of a number of REITs attracting attention from investors, due to market instability. In late 2010, REITs raised an estimated $9 billion, with a 6.5 percent annual yield. Lightstone Value Plus was the 18th-largest non-traded United States-based REIT, with a dividend of 7 percent. That percentage was much higher than many other non-traded REITs during that period. Following the success of Lightstone Value Plus, Lichtenstein launched a second non-traded REIT. Lightstone Value Plus II followed a similar strategy to the initial fund, focusing on investments across a number of markets.

The sale of Prime Retail and both REITs gave Lichtenstein a large fund to invest throughout 2011. According to reports, there was an estimated $350 million remaining from the Prime Retail sale, which was reinvested into new deals. In 2011, Lichtenstein purchased Festival Bay Mall in Florida for $25 million, Crown Plaza Boston North Shore hotel for $10 million and a residential development in Long Island City, New York, for $19.3 million.

Lichtenstein and Lightstone Group announced the launch of Phoenix Development Partners, which aimed to develop large-scale renting opportunities in New York City. Despite shifting his focus to New York City-based investments, Lichtenstein continued to grow his portfolio in other locations across the United States. In September 2012, Lightstone Group announced they would be purchasing a $51 million residential development in Long Island City.

In 2013, Lichtenstein and Marriott completed their first deal, the purchase of three Marriott-branded hotels in Iowa and Ohio for $21 million. Later that year, Lichtenstein traveled to Israel, to discuss entering the Israeli debt market. The loans from Israel were used to underwrite a number of developments in Brooklyn's Gowanus Canal area.

Following Amazon's decision to abandon its plans to build a headquarters in Queens, Lichtenstein called it the "worst day for NYC since 9-11," adding that "this time, the terrorists were elected."

Investments
Lichtenstein's strategy has expanded over the years, but its foundation remains a willingness to seek out properties that offer the prospect of high returns and have challenges or complexities that limit their appeal to other investors, including properties with distressed capital structures. Although the risks of this strategy are often publicly documented, the returns are quietly pocketed: closely held Lightstone has averaged more than 30% annual returns over much of its existence.

Lichtenstein has publicly stated that he made risky investments in the past. He even shared some of his business tactics by saying that it is clever to buy land, instead of the homes that are built on it. Lichtenstein has publicly shared his views on risks and predictions regarding commercial real estate on CNBC and Bloomberg News.

Lightstone continues to seek new acquisitions across the United States in both urban and suburban locations and across a wide range of property types, including industrial, office, retail, multifamily and hospitality.

Board roles
Bill de Blasio appointed Lichtenstein to the NYC Economic Development Corporation’s Board of Directors in 2015. Lichtenstein is a trustee of the Citizens Budget Commission, and is a Member of the Real Estate Roundtable and Co-Chair of the Real Estate Capital Policy Advisory Committee. Lichtenstein is a member of The Economic Club of New York. As part of his involvement in New York City real estate, he also serves on the Board of Governors of the Real Estate Board of New York.

Lichtenstein is a trustee of the Supervisory Committee for The New York Medical College, and is also a trustee of The Touro College and University System and sits on the Board. Lichtenstein is also a member of the Brookings Institution's Economic Studies Council.

Lichtenstein supports a number of social causes. Lichtenstein makes regular contributions to the New York chapter of the Special Olympics and New York Cares. He also supports the work of Memorial Sloan-Kettering Cancer Center; and both he and Lightstone Group give to Matt’s Promise and Hospice of Virginia.

In September 2005, Lightstone Group donated 50 Memphis apartments to help Hurricane Katrina victims in need of housing following the storm, offering the apartments rent-free for six months. "We are fortunate to have the ability to house families affected by this traumatic event and can only hope that in some small way, those affected by this tragedy will be able to take some comfort in receiving this temporary shelter", Lichtenstein said. Lichtenstein himself matched contributions to relief efforts dollar-for-dollar from all employees in The Lightstone Group's family of companies: The Lightstone Group, Prime Retail Inc., Prime Group Realty Trust (PGRT), Park Avenue Funding, LLC, Park Avenue Bank, Lightstone Securities and Lightstone Value Plus Real Estate Investment Trust.

Following Hurricane Sandy in November 2012, The Lightstone Group donated more than 11,000 square feet of office space at 1407 Broadway to assist businesses affected by the storm. More than 17 million square feet of office space in lower Manhattan had been shuttered in Sandy's aftermath. The donation – in collaboration with the city Economic Development Corporation – allowed the businesses to remain in the Manhattan offices for as long as six months. Lichtenstein is a founder of the Friendship House, an organization that provides housing near hospitals for families that want to be near loved ones in times of need.[53][54]

Books and radio show
Lichtenstein is the author of three books on the Orthodox Jewish perspective on current events and contemporary topics including terrorism, gay marriage, abortion, missionary activities, insanity, genetics, and vaccinations and has also authored a commentary on the Mishna Berura that presents the positions of many contemporary halachic authorities in relation to the text. Lichtenstein also has a weekly radio show which covers the Jewish perspective on a different controversial topic each week. The show is well known for including interviews with various prominent Rabbis and Jewish community leaders and the lineup of personalities interviewed includes both Haredi and Modern Orthodox leaders. The show airs on several stations in the New York-New Jersey area. The podcasts are available at http://podcast.headlinesbook.com/ or in an upated format at https://halachaheadlines.com/

References

External links
 The Lightstone old page design, About David Lichtenstein Page

1960 births
Living people
20th-century American Jews
American real estate businesspeople
American billionaires
21st-century American Jews